Sofya Zhuk was the defending champion, but chose not to participate this year.

Anastasia Potapova won the title, defeating Dayana Yastremska in the final, 6–4, 6–3.

Seeds

Draw

Finals

Top half

Section 1

Section 2

Bottom half

Section 3

Section 4

Qualifying

Seeds

Qualifiers

Draw

First qualifier

Second qualifier

Third qualifier

Fourth qualifier

Fifth qualifier

Sixth qualifier

Seventh qualifier

Eighth qualifier

External links

Girls' Singles
Wimbledon Championship by year – Girls' singles
Wimbledon